Nancy Princenthal (born 21 December 1955) is an American art historian, writer, and author. She is based in Brooklyn, New York.

Biography
Princenthal has contributed to a number of magazines including The New York Times, Artforum, and Parkett. She has been one of the Senior Editors of Art in America. She won the 2016 PEN America award for biography. Princenthal has written about Shirin Neshat, Doris Salcedo, Robert Mangold and Alfredo Jaar and others.

Princenthal has worked at the Center for Curatorial Studies, Bard College; Princeton University; Yale University; and the School of Visual Arts.

Bibliography

Sources

1955 births
Living people
Women art historians
Writers from New York City
American art historians
School of Visual Arts faculty
Yale University faculty
Historians from New York (state)